Bukchon Hanok Village is a Korean traditional village in Seoul with a long history located on the top of a hill between Gyeongbok Palace, Changdeok Palace and Jongmyo Royal Shrine. The traditional village is composed of many alleys, hanok and is preserved to show a 600-year-old urban environment.

History
The area of Bukchon, which consists of neighborhoods: Wonseo-dong, Jae-dong, Gye-dong, Gahoe-dong and Insa-dong, was traditionally the residential quarter of high-ranking government officials and nobility during the Joseon Dynasty. It is located north of Cheonggye Stream and Jongno, hence named Bukchon, which means north village

Tourism
A poll of nearly 2,000 foreign visitors, conducted by the Seoul Metropolitan Government in November 2011, stated that exploring the narrow streets of Bukchon was their fourth favorite activity in Seoul.

According to data by the Bukchon Traditional Culture Center, 30,000 people visited the area in 2007. However, after the village was featured in television programmes, such as 1 Night 2 Days and Personal Taste, the number rose to 318,000 in 2010. In 2012 the figure is expected to double to more than 600,000.

A large beautiful hanok has open to the public in 2015, as part of the Seoul Museum of History. It is located in an alley, just on the foot of the hill. Entrance is free, the visit allows to see those traditional housing in 15–20 minutes.

If you want to get to Bukchon Hanok Village it is close to Samcheongdong street and located between the Gyeongbokgung Palace and Changdeokgung Palace. You can get to the Bukchon Hanok Village in Seoul by taking the subway to the Anguk Station (Seoul Subway Line 3). Take exit 3 and head to your right. After about 200 meters you will see large information signs that begin the Bukchon Village Walking Tour. In this Hanok Village there is a free walking tour is about 2–3 hours long taking you to multiple destinations will you collect stamps from each of them and at the end you can get a keychain at the end. The village is the home to Bukchon Traditional Culture Center, Seoul Intangible Cultural Heritage Center, Donglim Knot Museum, Gahoe Museum, Han Sangsu Embroidery Museum, Bukchon Asian Art Museum, and Owl Museum. Sll place to you should make sure to visit on your trip to Korea. In Bukchon that has over 600 years of history surrounding it many of these hanoks operate as cultural centers, guesthouses, restaurants, and tea houses, providing visitors with an opportunity to experience, learn and immerse themselves in traditional Korean culture. They have very  picturesque locations and beautiful architecture that you no longer seen in modern-day society. Overall the villages are amazing locations that everyone should see and enjoy. Many tourists come here for photo opportunities and to immerse themselves in the history that is now surrounded by the modern Korea. You can make a guided tour reservation to help you go around the trail. There are tons if things to do while you are there. Recently in 2018 because of so many tourists visiting the area they have changed the hours of when people may visit from 9-5 Monday-Saturday and Sundays is now closed off to nonresidents. Currently there is an issue with tourists making trouble for the residents that live there; one resident even being yelled at for driving their car on its narrow roads. Residents who live there are not very happy that their resident environment is being taken over by an overwhelming number of tourists taking photos all the time. This village averages about 10,000 visitors a day. Because of the tourists the number of residents fell from over 9000 to 7530; they say the tourists are driving the residents out of the neighborhood.

Some tourists compare Bukchon Hanok Village to a typical town in Switzerland, or Gatlinburg, Tennessee, or Galena, Illinois in the United States.

Gallery

Media
KBS《Documentary 3 days - Morning at Bukchon》(June 27, 2009)
KBS《1 Night 2 Days() - Seoul special》 (September 26, 2010)

See also
Namsangol Hanok Village
Korean Folk Village
Hahoe Folk Village
Yangdong Village of Gyeongju
Jeonju Hanok Village
Rakkojae

References

External links

 Bukchon Hanok Village - Seoul's official site
 Bukchon (Jongno-gu)
Gallery of Buchon Hanok Village
 Gahoe-dong Hanok Village at the Women Dong-a
 Rakkojae Seoul Hanok Hotel
 A detailed guide to Bukchon Hanok Village

Folk villages in South Korea
Neighbourhoods of Jongno-gu
Joseon dynasty
Architecture in Korea
Tourist attractions in Seoul
Korean traditions